Phosphate-selective porins are a family of outer bacterial membrane proteins. These are anion-specific porins, the binding site of which has a higher affinity for phosphate than chloride ions. Porin O has a higher affinity for polyphosphates, while porin P has a higher affinity for orthophosphate. In Pseudomonas aeruginosa, porin O was found to be expressed only under phosphate-starvation conditions during the stationary growth phase.

References

Outer membrane proteins
Protein families